ESF1 homolog is a protein that in humans is encoded by the ESF1 gene.

References

Further reading